"To Be, to Be, Ten Made to Be" is Tackey & Tsubasa's debut single under the Avex Trax label. This is the first retail single for their 2wenty 2wo album.

Overview
"To Be, to Be, Ten Made to Be" is the debut single released by singer duo Tackey & Tsubasa. The a-side song "Sotsugyou:Sayonara wa Ashita no Tameni" was used as the insert song for the anime InuYasha on episode 124, only the version of the song used was not the same version that is on this single. It was also used as the Olympus "μDigital" commercial song. The single was released in five different editions, the regular edition with only the songs, a second edition containing a video of the PVs "True Heart", "Ki・Se・Ki", and "Get Down", another edition containing the said PVs on DVD, the fourth coming with a DVD with the said PVs and extra goods, and the last one containing the said PVs on video along with extra goods.

Sample of the translated lyrics:
We're becoming memories
Your nearby warmth is no longer granted to me
My painful sighs suddenly overflowed
and whirled up faraway in the distance to reach you

Music video
The promotional video for "Sotsugyou: Sayonara wa Ashita no Tameni" was shot in an unknown location by director Akie Hayashi. This PV showcases Tackey and Tsubasa singing in a small clearing, densely surrounded by bushes and vines. During the second chorus, the scene switches to the two standing up with a cloudy sky behind them. Also seen in the PV is a cage that, depending on the scene, either has two doves in it, or is empty. Once the instrumental is over, and the chorus is sung again, the two are seen standing up in the bush and vine area, only this time with sakura petals flying around them.

Track listing

Regular CD Format
 "" (Kenn Kato, Ryouki Matsumoto) - 5:34
 "To Be, or Not to Be" (Hideyuki Obata, Toshiharu Umezaki, Takehito Shimizu, Yuta Nakano) - 5:17
 "Brand-new Song Medley" - 5:37
 ""
 ""
 "Love&Tough"

Limited CD+DVD Format

CD Portion
 "" (Kenn Kato, Ryouki Matsumoto) - 5:34
 "To Be, or Not to Be" (Hideyuki Obata, Toshiharu Umezaki, Takehito Shimizu, Yuta Nakano) - 5:17
 "Brand-new Song Medley" - 5:37
 ""
 ""
 "Love&Tough"

DVD Portion
 "Hatachi visual mix"
 ": Get Down True Heart"
 "True Heart"

Personnel
 Takizawa Hideaki - vocals
 Imai Tsubasa - vocals

TV performances
 February 21, 2003 - Music Station

Charts
Oricon Sales Chart (Japan)

RIAJ Certification
As of January 2004, "To Be, to Be, Ten Made to Be" has been certified gold for shipments of over 100,000 by the Recording Industry Association of Japan.

References 
 
 

2003 singles
Tackey & Tsubasa songs
2003 songs
Avex Trax singles